"Amateur Hour" is a song by Sparks. It was released as the second single from their 1974 album Kimono My House. Bassist Martin Gordon was requested to replace his original bass part (recorded using a Rickenbacker 4001 bass) with a Fender Precision bass, belonging to his subsequent replacement in the band.

A re-recording was produced in 1997 for the retrospective Plagiarism album. This new version was given a complete electronic synthpop overhaul and was performed with Erasure.

On 25 June 2009, the song "Amateur Hour" was featured in a stunt when UK magician and mentalist Mark Cairns predicted that radio personality George Lamb would choose the Sparks song, in a free choice from a list of 100 tracks that had been recently played on Lamb's BBC Radio 6 Music show.

Track listing
 "Amateur Hour" — 3:37
 "Lost and Found" — 3:21

Personnel
Russell Mael - vocals
Ron Mael - keyboards
Martin Gordon - bass
Adrian Fisher - guitar
Norman "Dinky" Diamond - drums

Chart positions

References

1974 singles
Songs written by Ron Mael
Sparks (band) songs
Song recordings produced by Muff Winwood
1974 songs
Island Records singles